Daniel Bernard (29 September 1949 – 9 April 2020) was a French professional footballer who played as a goalkeeper.

Career
Born in Paris, Bernard played club football for Paris-Neuilly, Rennes, Paris Saint-Germain, Brest and Monaco.

He represented France at youth level, but never played for the senior team, though he was an unused substitute on one occasion.

Later life and death
Bernard died on 9 April 2020 aged 70, a few weeks after the death of his daughter.

References

1949 births
2020 deaths
French footballers
Stade Rennais F.C. players
Paris Saint-Germain F.C. players
Stade Brestois 29 players
AS Monaco FC players
Ligue 2 players
Ligue 1 players
Association football goalkeepers
France youth international footballers